Jeff Rivera (born September 5, 1976 in Salt Lake City, Utah), is an American novelist who writes books targeted at young adults.  His most recent work, Forever My Lady, was released by Warner Books in July 2007.  He is also the author of Oh Yes I Can! (2003).

Forever My Lady
Forever My Lady is a story about a Latino juvenile delinquent who transforms his life in prison boot camp in order to win back the love of the girl he lost.   Rivera was inspired to write the story when, after a period living in his car, he met a former gang member who turned his life around.   Before it was picked up by Warner Books, 8,000 copies were in circulation in both print and electronic versions that Rivera had self-published.

Harriet Klausner called it "a terrific character driven redemption tale".

Recognition

Mahogany Media Award for Best New Author and Best Urban Fiction (2007)

References

External links
Official website
Publishers Weekly review of Forever My Lady
Stories from the street, National Public Radio
Midwest Review

1976 births
Living people
21st-century American novelists
African-American novelists
American male novelists
Writers from Salt Lake City
American writers of young adult literature
21st-century American male writers
Novelists from Utah
21st-century African-American writers
20th-century African-American people
African-American male writers